Marian Kulesza, Lith.  Marijonas Kuleša , (1878–1943) was a Polish academic painter, born in Suwałki, worked in Vilnius.

References
Two pictures
Universal Lithuanian Encyclopedia
Kulesza

Lithuanian painters
19th-century Polish painters
19th-century Polish male artists
20th-century Polish painters
20th-century Polish male artists
1878 births
1943 deaths
Polish male painters